The 1992 World Junior Championships in Athletics was the fourth edition of the international athletics competition for athletes aged 19 years or under. It was held in Seoul, South Korea from September 16 to September 20, 1992.

Results

Men

Women

Medal table

Participation
According to an unofficial count through an unofficial result list, 954 athletes from 90 countries participated in the event.  This is in agreement with the official numbers as published.

See also
1992 in athletics (track and field)

References

External links
Results at GBRathletics.com
Results from World Junior Athletics History (WJAH)
Official results

 
World Junior
World Junior Championships in Athletics
Athletics 1992
Sport in Seoul
World Athletics U20 Championships